Film title design is a term describing the craft and design of motion picture title sequences. Since the beginning of the film form, it has been an essential part of any motion picture. Originally a motionless piece of artwork called title art, it slowly evolved into an artform of its own.

History

In the beginning, main title design consisted of the movie studio's name and/or logo and the presentation of the main characters along with the actor's names, generally using that same artwork presented on title cards. Most independent or major studio had their own title art logo used as the background for their screen credits and they used it almost exclusively on every movie that they produced.

Then, early in the 1930s, the more progressive motion picture studios started to change their approach in presenting their screen credits. The major studios took on the challenge of improving the way they introduced their movies. They made the decision to present a more complete list of credits to go with a higher quality of artwork to be used in their screen credits.

A main title designer is the designer of the movie title. The manner in which title of a movie is displayed on screen is widely considered an art form. It has often been classified as motion graphics, title design, title sequences and animated credits. The title sequence is often presented through animated visuals and kinetic type while the credits are introduced on screen. The Morrison Studio is a leading title sequence company in both film and TV, with great examples of title design from films such as Tim Burton's Batman (1989) and Sweeney Todd (2007) through to Creation Stories (2021). Led by title designers Richard Morrison and Dean Wares.

From the mid-1930s through the late-1940s the major film studios led the way in Film Title Art by employing artists like Al Hirschfeld, George Petty, Ted Ireland (Vencentini), William Galraith Crawford, Symeon Shimin,  and Jacques Kapralik.

Quality artists met this challenge by designing their artwork to "set a mood" and "capture the audience" before the movie started. An overall 10% jump in box-office receipts was proof that this was a profitable improvement to the introduction of their motion pictures.

Pacific Title & Art Studio was an American company founded in Hollywood in 1919 by Leon Schlesinger. Originally they produced title cards for silent films, but moved into film title design. One of their artists, Wayne Fitzgerald  was encouraged by Warren Beatty to design titles on his own. Phill Norman was a contemporary American film title designer at the same time

One famous example of the form is the work of Saul Bass in the 1950s and 1960s. His modish title sequences for the films of Alfred Hitchcock were key in setting the style and mood of the movie even before the action began, and contributed to Hitchcock's "house style" that was a key element in his approach to marketing.  Another well known designer is Maurice Binder, who designed the often erotic titles for most of the James Bond films from the 1960s to the 1980s; Robert Brownjohn designed two of the films. After Binder's death, Daniel Kleinman has done several of the titles.

However, the leader in the industry in the 1990s - 2000 was Cinema Research Corporation, with over 400 movie titles to its credit in that time period alone, and almost 700 titles in total from the 1950s to 2000.

Modern technology has enabled a much more fantastical way of presenting them through use of programs such as Adobe After Effects and Maxon Cinema4D. Although a form of editing, it's considered a different role and art form rather than of a traditional film editor.

Further reading
Art of the Title

References

External links

The Morrison Studio – Title sequence company, led by Richard Morrison and Dean Wares

Film and television opening sequences
Design
Film and video terminology